Songs from the Laundry Room is an EP by American rock band Foo Fighters, released exclusively for Record Store Day 2015. This EP and the Foo Fighters album are the two Foo Fighters releases upon which Dave Grohl plays all the instruments.

Release

Released exclusively for Record Store Day 2015, just 4,000 copies were made available of the 10" vinyl, which includes two demo versions of songs from the band's debut album Foo Fighters, a cover song, and a previously unreleased song, titled "Empty Handed".

Re-release

On September 11, 2015 it was announced that Foo Fighters intended to re-release their rare Songs From the Laundry Room EP as a mainstream release. Later the same day, the EP became available digitally.

Track listing
All songs written and composed by Dave Grohl, except "Kids in America" by Marty and Ricky Wilde.

Chart positions

References

Foo Fighters compilation albums
Record Store Day releases
2015 EPs
Foo Fighters EPs
2015 compilation albums